Waikino is a small settlement at the eastern end of a gorge in the North Island of New Zealand alongside the Ohinemuri River, between Waihi and the Karangahake Gorge. The Waikino district lies at the base of the ecologically sensitive Coromandel Peninsula with its subtropical rainforests, steep ravines and fast moving rivers and streams. The cascades of the Owharoa Falls lie just to the south west of the settlement.

The population of Waikino was 213 people in 90 households in the 2013 New Zealand census.

History 
Gold mining around Waikino has a history dating back to early colonisation of New Zealand. Waikino was the focal point of gold mining in the Waikato-Bay of Plenty district with the 1897 construction of the Victoria Battery on the edge of what was a busy town supporting the extensive local mining industry. Waikino's Victoria Battery processed ore from the large Martha Mine in Waihi. The Victoria Battery was then New Zealand's largest industrial complex. Besides processing ore, it supported carpenters' shops, a sawmill and a foundry. With 200 stamps, the battery was the largest quartz crushing plant for gold extraction in Australasia, and was capable of crushing over 812 tonnes of ore each day to the consistency of sand. The loud thumping sounds of crushing rock could be heard 10 kilometres away.

Up the scenic Waitekauri road 5 km behind Waikino, once existed the mining town of Waitekauri, near Golden Cross. Waitekauri is no longer there today, because the town was demolished at the end of that era's gold rush, consequently the village reverted to farmland. The local Waitekauri pub, the historic two storeyed "Golden Cross Hotel", was literally transported to Waihi where it stands proud today as a reminder of days gone by.

On 19 October 1923, the Waikino school shooting occurred at Waikino School, claiming the lives of two students, Kelvin McLean, aged 13, and Charles Stewart, aged 9. This remains New Zealand's only school shooting. The gunman, John Christopher Higgins, was convicted of murder and sentenced to death. The death sentence was commuted to life imprisonment. Higgins later had his conviction quashed, on the grounds of insanity.

When gold became uneconomic to mine after World War II, Waikino residents lost their economic base and the town reverted into a sleepy little village predominantly inhabited by retirees from the old era. However, the small retail business community in Waikino's main street endured till the late 1950s. When Tom and Nell Buchanan finally closed the doors to the local general store and haberdashery and retired up on the hill behind the village, this signalled the end of an era.

The 1970s heralded an influx of new people to Waikino, drawn by cheap housing and magnificent scenery. The counterculture had arrived in town and set about transforming Waikino into a bustling centre for hippies and crafts people to gravitate towards. These counterculture folks purchased many of the old houses in the village which had been neglected over time, even converting some of them into small craft workshops and outlets from where they sold their wares locally and around the nation. Waikinos main highway retail shops were back in business.

The main highway (State Highway 2) retail shops which traversed the beautiful Ohinemuri river before it plunged into the Karangahake Gorge had its old shops and Lodge Hall refurbished and reopened from this influx of young alternative lifestyle people moving in their droves away from the big city chaos. Social revolution was in the air, this was the roaring seventies, and for many young people the flow from big city living towards a more country-oriented sustainable lifestyle in rural New Zealand was the name of the game. Overnight, flourishing cottage industry crafts and health food outlets grew around Waikino, servicing the local village and Coromandel. Once again, the former ghost town, having been closed down for some time, became the focal meeting point of the community. The business strip reinvigorated, people returned to town to do business. Hundreds of tourists, drawn by the quirky hippie atmosphere, stopped at Waikino's main highway retail outlets every week to try out healthy homemade foods at the tea rooms, and to purchase locally made Arts and crafts from the various hippy shops. Some stopped to simply chill out taking in the scenic atmosphere, watching the Ohinemuri river flow into the breathtaking Karangahake Gorge.

January 1977 saw the community supporting the Waikino music festival of rock, blues and culture, held on Bicknels farm up the Waitawheta Valley. This festival event was run by the Nambassa group who were originally based in the Waikino village, prior to their move to Waihi. Proceeds from this event purchased a winter's supply of fuel for the aged residents of the village and towards the construction of a new post office after the 1981 flood.

1981 flood 

The main highway shops came to a devastating end in the great Ohinemuri river floods of 1981. A huge torrent of water literally picked up the Waikino business district and many homes, and washed them downstream through the Karangahake Gorge. All that was salvageable was the Waikino Hotel and the local community hall, both of which remain operational today.

A new post office was later built on higher ground with funds raised by the community. Initially the National Government deemed a new community post office uneconomical, and so decided not to replace one of the town's focal community services which was depended on by the large aged population to cash their weekly pension cheques. This unwelcome decision raised an uproar among the locals, many of whom became overnight activists. This heralded the establishment of the "Waikino Action committee", which lobbied Government and the wider community to have a new community post office constructed. After a bitter campaign the Government agreed to build a post office, conditional on the community footing much of the bill – which it did. After the postal services were privatised under Rogernomics in the 1990s this postal service was terminated permanently.

Waikino also has its own primary school which caters for children from as far as Waihi with a daily bus service. The school provides for Year 1 to 6 students, and boasts one computer per two students.

Tourism and cottage industries are Waikino's primary revenue sources today. Numerous organised tours and walks around the old mining facilities and old rail tunnels, and around beautiful native bush which surround waterfalls and scenic valleys, are available. There is also a community sponsored heritage railway from the Waikino station café to Waihi, the Goldfields Railway. This line used to be part of the East Coast Main Trunk Railway and opened in November 1905, but in 1978, a deviation to the south opened and made it redundant. The Goldfields Railway successfully saved the 6 km of track between Waihi and Waikino and is now a popular tourist attraction, running trains daily with preserved steam locomotives and diesel locomotives providing motive power.

Demographics
It is part of the wider Waihi Rural statistical area.

Waikino had a population of 306 at the 2018 New Zealand census, an increase of 3 people (1.0%) since the 2013 census, and an increase of 21 people (7.4%) since the 2006 census. There were 138 households, comprising 150 males and 153 females, giving a sex ratio of 0.98 males per female, with 48 people (15.7%) aged under 15 years, 39 (12.7%) aged 15 to 29, 153 (50.0%) aged 30 to 64, and 72 (23.5%) aged 65 or older.

Ethnicities were 93.1% European/Pākehā, 18.6% Māori, and 4.9% Pacific peoples. People may identify with more than one ethnicity.

Although some people chose not to answer the census's question about religious affiliation, 62.7% had no religion, 24.5% were Christian and 2.9% had other religions.

Of those at least 15 years old, 33 (12.8%) people had a bachelor's or higher degree, and 57 (22.1%) people had no formal qualifications. 18 people (7.0%) earned over $70,000 compared to 17.2% nationally. The employment status of those at least 15 was that 105 (40.7%) people were employed full-time, 39 (15.1%) were part-time, and 21 (8.1%) were unemployed.

Education

References

External links

 WELCOME TO WAIKINO
 Waikinos historic walkway
 Waikino Railway cafe
 Goldfields Railway
 Waikino letters
 Waikino School

Populated places in Waikato
Hauraki District